Haanappel is a surname. Notable people with the surname include:

Joan Haanappel (born 1940), Dutch figure skater and sports presenter
Matthew Haanappel (born 1994), Australian Paralympic swimmer